Sacha Bennett (born 11 May 1971) is a British actor, writer, producer and director for film and television. As a film-maker he has worked with talent such as Bob Hoskins, Jenny Agutter and Steven Berkoff. He has created films for Hollywood Studios and Independent Distributors, from action-thrillers to Shakespeare adaptations.
He was born in Harpenden, Hertfordshire where he attended St. George's School. He now resides in West Hampstead, London.

Filmography
 Blackadder: Back & Forth (1999) - actor (played Will Scarlet)
 Devilwood (2006) - writer, director, producer
 Tuesday (2008) - writer, producer, director
 Bonded by Blood (2010) - director, writer
 Outside Bet (2012) - writer, director
 Rocky (2012) - producer
 Get Lucky (2013) - writer, director
 Plastic (2013) - writer
 We Still Kill The Old Way (2014) - director, writer
 Armada (2015) - writer
 Beautiful Devils (2015) - writer
 We Still Steal The Old Way (2015) - director, writer
 Tango One (2018) - director, writer
 Ghetto Heaven - director
 A Midsummer Night's Dream (2020) - director
 Last Pole (2018) - director, producer
 Ethel (short film) (2019) - producer
 Me, Myself and Di (2020) - producer
 West End Girls (2023) - director
 The Glove (2023) - co-producer
 King Arthur: Dawn of Pendragon (2024) - writer, director, producer

External links

1971 births
Living people
English male film actors
People from Harpenden
Male actors from Hertfordshire